Povilas Gaidys (born 21 February 1991) is a Lithuanian professional basketball player, who last played for EuroNickel 2005 of the Macedonian League. Standing at 208 cm (6 ft 10 in), Gaidys plays as power forward.

College career
Povilas Gaidys played college basketball at the Kalamazoo Valley and Southeastern Fire. In season 2011-12 Gaidys averaged 8.2 points in 33 appearances.

Playing career
In 2015, Gaidys signed with UBSC Raiffeisen Graz. In the season 2015-16 he averaged 15.3 points, 9.4 rebounds in 31.4 minutes in 28 appearances. On February 2, 2016, he signed with Allianz Swans Gmunden On August 18, 2018, he signed with Macedonian basketball club Blokotehna

References

1991 births
Power forwards (basketball)
Living people
Lithuanian men's basketball players
People from Druskininkai